The ice sledge hockey competition of the 2010 Winter Paralympics was held at the UBC Winter Sports Centre in Vancouver, British Columbia, Canada, from 13 March to 20 March 2010.

For the first time, women were allowed to compete in ice sledge hockey at the Paralympic Games.

Following high hopes in the host nation, Canada's defeat in the semi-finals was described as causing "national despair".

Medalists

Qualification 
Six slots were reserved for the top six finishers at the 2009 IPC Ice Sledge Hockey World Championships, one slot was reserved for the winner of the 2009 IPC Ice Sledge Hockey Paralympic Qualifier, and one slot was reserved for the host country, Canada. Since Canada placed in the top six of the World Championships, the eighth slot was given to the second-place finisher at the Paralympic Qualifier.

Team rosters 
The rules promulgated by the International Paralympic Committee provide that each participating NPC may enter a maximum of:
One men's team of fifteen eligible male athletes; or
One mixed team of up to sixteen eligible athletes of whom a minimum of one of the athletes is female.

It was reported that this decision was taken without consulting Canada, the reigning champion in the sport. Hockey Canada announced that there would be no women on the Canadian ice sledge hockey roster at the Paralympics, because no Canadian women play at that level. At the 2006 Paralympics in Turin, Sweden attempted to put a female player on their roster, but were not allowed to do so.

Preliminary round
All times are local (UTC-8).

Group A

Group B

Classification round

Bracket

5–8th place semifinals

Seventh place game

Fifth place game

Medal round

Bracket

Semifinals

Bronze medal game

Gold medal game

Final ranking

Statistics

Scoring leaders
List shows the top ten skaters sorted by points, then goals.

GP = Games played; G = Goals; A = Assists; Pts = Points; +/− = Plus/minus; PIM = Penalties in minutes; POS = PositionSource: Vancouver 2010

Leading goaltenders
Only the top five goaltenders, based on save percentage, who have played at least 40% of their team's minutes, are included in this list.
TOI = Time on ice (minutes:seconds); GA = Goals against; GAA = Goals against average; SA = Shots against; Sv% = Save percentage; SO = ShutoutsSource: Vancouver 2010

Awards
Best players selected by the directorate:
Best Goaltender:  Steve Cash
Best Defenceman:  Taylor Chace
Best Forward:  Greg Westlake
MVP:  Brad Bowden
Media All-Stars:
Goaltender:  Steve Cash
Defencemen:  Taylor Chace /  Adam Dixon
Forwards:  Greg Westlake /  Alexi Salamone /  Florian Planker
MVP:  Brad Bowden

See also 
Ice hockey at the 2010 Winter Olympics

References

External links
 2010 Winter Paralympics – Ice Sledge Hockey Schedule and Results
Results book

2010 Winter Paralympics events
Paralympics, Winter
2010